is a city located in the southern part of Kyoto Prefecture, Japan. As of October 1, 2020 the city has an estimated population of 73,753 and a population density of 1,718 persons per km². The total area is 42.92 km².

History
Kyōtanabe was briefly the capital of Japan during the reign of Emperor Keitai.  The life of the Imperial court was centered at Tsutsuki Palace where the emperor lived in 511–518.

The modern city was founded on April 1, 1997, after the town of Tanabe was reorganized into the city of Kyōtanabe. The Kyō- was added to distinguish it from the city of Tanabe, Wakayama.

Geography 

 Kizu River

Climate
Kyōtanabe has a humid subtropical climate (Köppen Cfa), featuring a marked seasonal variation in temperature and precipitation. Summers are hot and humid, but winters are relatively cold with occasional snowfall.

Demographics
Per Japanese census data, the population of Kyōtanabe in 2020 is 73,753 people. Kyōtanabe's population has increased roughly sevenfold over the past century. The city has grown almost continuously since the census began in 1920, and saw especially rapid growth in the late 20th century.

Education 
 Doshisha Women's College of Liberal Arts
 Doshisha Women's Junior College

Notable people from Kyōtanabe, Kyoto
 Kenji Takao, Japanese running coach and former long-distance runner (10,000 metres)
 Takuya Muguruma, Japanese former football player 
 Akinari Kawazura, Japanese football player (Omiya Ardija, J2 League)
 Meg Hemphill, Japanese track and field athlete
 Momo Hirai, Japanese singer, dancer, model, MC, member of South Korean girl group Twice

References

External links

 Kyotanabe City official website 
 Kyotanabe City official website 

Cities in Kyoto Prefecture
Former capitals of Japan